Remototrachyna sipmaniana is a species of saxicolous (rock-dwelling), foliose lichen in the family Parmeliaceae. It is only known to occur in Bolivia, where it grows on boulders in Yungas mountain cloud forests.

Taxonomy

Remototrachyna sipmaniana was formally described as a new species in 2012 by Martin Kukwa and Adam Flakus. The specific epithet honours Dutch lichenologist Harrie Sipman, "an eminent lichenologist dealing with tropical lichens, and co-author of the monograph of the genus Hypotrachyna in the Neotropics".

Description
The lobes comprising the thallus are typically 5–8 mm wide with a thin black rim around the margins. The medulla is white, while the thallus undersurface is shiny, smooth, and black. Black to dark brown rhizines serve as holdfasts to help attach the lichen to its substrate. On the thallus surface rest the apothecia, which are cup-shaped with a concave, light brown disc, and measure 2–5 mm wide. Ascospores are hyaline with an ellipsoid shape, and dimensions of 9.5–11 by 5.5–6 μm. Lichen products that have been detected in this species include atranorin, protocetraric acid, and gyrophoric acid as major components, and minor amounts of lecanoric acid.

References

Parmeliaceae
Lichen species
Lichens described in 2012
Lichens of Bolivia
Taxa named by Adam Grzegorz Flakus